Gerrit Jan van Eijken (Amersfoort, 5 May 1832 - Dalston, London, 22 March 1879) was a Dutch composer. He studied first under his father, Gerrit van Eijken, who was organist and bell-ringer at the Grote Kerk in Amersfoort. His elder brother Jan Albert van Eijken was also a composer.

In 1859 the organist Karl Emanuel Klitzsch commented favourably in the Neue Zeitschrift fur Musik on his works. But after initial successes he suffered from disappointment as a composer and became prey to alcoholism. In his last years he earned a living as an organist in London, and died at the age of 46.

Works, editions and recordings
 Songs of Love and Death - Lieder Töne der Liebe aus dem hohen Lied op. 10; Gedichte op.8 Nr. 1 & 2; op. 11; Lieder op.6 2 & 3. With Jan Albert van Eijken: Lieder op. 30 Nr. 2, 4;Lied op. 28, 2; Lieder op. 12 Nr. 3, 4,6; op 33 Nr. 3 & 4. Performed by Anne Grimm (soprano), Marcel Reijans (tenor), Geert Smits (bass), Frans van Ruth (piano). NM Classics, 1997.
Violin Sonata in f minor, Op. 5; Performed by Bob van der Ent (violin), René Rakier (piano). Aliud Records, 2011

References

Dutch composers
University of Music and Theatre Leipzig alumni
1832 births
1879 deaths
People from Amersfoort
19th-century composers

People from Dalston